Keasden is a hamlet in the civil parish of Clapham-cum-Newby, in the Craven district of the county of North Yorkshire, in the north-western England. The hamlet sits on an unclassified road and is surrounded to the north, south and west by woodland. Keasden has a church but no schools. The postcode is LA2.

References 

Hamlets in North Yorkshire